Shubachevo is a rural locality (a village) in Zhityovskoye Rural Settlement, Syamzhensky District, Vologda Oblast, Russia. The population was 7 as of 2002.

Geography 
Shubachevo is located 27 km southeast of Syamzha (the district's administrative centre) by road. Levinskaya is the nearest rural locality.

References 

Rural localities in Syamzhensky District